Richard Whitehead MBE (born 19 July 1976) is a British athlete. He runs with prosthetic legs, as he has a double through-knee congenital amputation.

He set world records for athletes with a double amputation, in both the full and half marathon. At the 2010 Chicago Marathon, he broke his previous world record for athletes with lower-limb amputations, with a time of 2:42:52. Whitehead's marathon record was beaten by 28 seconds by Marko Cheseto at the 2019 Boston Marathon.

Whitehead was unable to compete in the marathon at London 2012 as there was no category for leg amputees, and was refused permission by the IPC to compete against upper-body amputees and so had to turn to sprinting to compete at the 2012 Paralympics, where he won the gold medal in the 200m T42 Athletics event with a world record time of 24.38 seconds.

His earlier career was a swimming and dance teacher at Clifton Leisure Centre in Nottingham.  He is a former ice sledge hockey player, and competed for the GB team at the 2006 Winter Paralympics in Turin.

Whitehead was appointed Member of the Order of the British Empire (MBE) in the 2013 New Year Honours for services to athletics.

Whitehead was appointed the first-ever patron of Sarcoma UK, the bone- and soft-tissue cancer charity, on 28 January 2013.

Whitehead is a patron of Footprints Conductive Education Centre, a charity in his home town of Nottingham, who help children with mobility and communication problems develop the skills they need to thrive and achieve their potential. Whitehead is also a patron of Gedling Sports Partnership, a charity that promotes sport and physical education in the borough of Gedling.

His name was added to the Nottingham City Transport bus service "Pathfinder 100" on 18 September 2012; the bus links his home village of Lowdham with Southwell and Nottingham.

On 21 April 2013 he competed in the London Marathon coming in 23rd place with a time of 3:15:53.

At the 2016 Rio Paralympics, Whitehead won gold in the T42 200 metres and silver in the T42 100 metres, which he shared with Denmark's Daniel Wagner after the pair finished in a dead heat for second.

In 2013, he launched his fundraising campaign, "Richard Whitehead Runs Britain", to run from John O'Groats to Land's End.

At the 2020 Tokyo Paralympics, Whitehead won silver in the T61 200 metres.

In 2022, Whitehead took part in Channel 4's Celebrity Hunted. He was caught 5th, after falling over a gate, and subsequently lying low in a field. His teammate Iwan Thomas successfully made it to the extraction point to win.

See also
 2012 Summer Olympics and Paralympics gold post boxes
 Mechanics of Oscar Pistorius's running blades

References

 Athlete Search Results – Whitehead, Richard, International Paralympic Committee (IPC)
 Richard Whitehead: Forget Oscar Pistorius – I'm the fastest man on no legs, insideworldparasport.biz, 18 March 2010

External links
 

1976 births
Living people
Members of the Order of the British Empire
Paralympic athletes of Great Britain
Ice sledge hockey players at the 2006 Winter Paralympics
Athletes (track and field) at the 2012 Summer Paralympics
Paralympic gold medalists for Great Britain
Paralympic silver medalists for Great Britain
World record holders in Paralympic athletics
British male sprinters
English amputees
Sportspeople from Nottingham
Medalists at the 2012 Summer Paralympics
English male sprinters
English male marathon runners
Athletes (track and field) at the 2016 Summer Paralympics
Medalists at the 2016 Summer Paralympics
Medalists at the 2020 Summer Paralympics
Medalists at the World Para Athletics Championships
Medalists at the World Para Athletics European Championships
Paralympic medalists in athletics (track and field)
Athletes (track and field) at the 2020 Summer Paralympics
Sprinters with limb difference
Paralympic sprinters